is a national highway of Japan on the island of Kyushu. The  highway begins in the city of Ōmura in Nagasaki Prefecture and ends in the city of Saga in Saga Prefecture.

References

444
Roads in Nagasaki Prefecture
Roads in Saga Prefecture